The  was a far-right faction during the Spanish transition to democracy.  The group of hardline francoists opposed political and social reform. Its steadfast refusal to compromise led to its name of "bunker". Under the presidency of Carlos Arias Navarro, Búnker and its leading member, José Antonio Girón, opposed any movement towards reform. Blas Piñar was another member of the group.

The name of the 's mouthpiece, El Alcázar, refers to the Siege of the Alcázar, where nationalist forces held the Alcázar of Toledo against an overwhelmingly larger Spanish Republican Army during the Spanish Civil War.

External links
 Picture of Piñar and Girón

Far-right politics in Spain
Spanish transition to democracy